These are the official results of the Women's Javelin Throw event at the 1983 World Championships in Helsinki, Finland. There were a total of 23 participating athletes, with the final held on Saturday August 13, 1983. The qualification mark was set at 62.00 metres. All results were made with a rough surfaced javelin (old design).

Medalists

Schedule
All times are Eastern European Time (UTC+2)

Abbreviations
All results shown are in metres

Records

Qualification

Group A

Group B

Final

See also
 1980 Women's Olympic Javelin Throw (Moscow)
 1982 Women's European Championships Javelin Throw (Athens)
 1984 Women's Olympic Javelin Throw (Los Angeles)
 1986 Women's European Championships Javelin Throw (Stuttgart)
 1988 Women's Olympic Javelin Throw (Seoul)

References
 Results

J
Javelin throw at the World Athletics Championships
1983 in women's athletics